The Type 423 Oste class are purpose built signals intelligence (SIGINT/ELINT) and reconnaissance ships of the German Navy. Officially designated as "fleet service ships", they replaced the Type 422 class.

Accommodation for the crew was designed to civil standards, and the Oste class offers much more comfort for the crew than other ships in the German Navy.

List of ships

The ships were built at Flensburger Schiffbau-Gesellschaft in Flensburg.

All ships are currently based in Eckernförde and belong to the 1st Ubootgeschwader (1st Submarine Squadron) stationed in Eckernförde. The vessels received the same name and pennant numbers as the three Type 422 class vessels they replaced. To avoid the confusion, the ship names are sometimes suffixed with II.

Oker (A53) was reportedly spotted near the Syrian coast in August 2012. Later she was seen in Greenwich, UK in February 2017

References
Notes

Bibliography
 

Electronic intelligence ships
 
Auxiliary surveillance ship classes